The 17th Airborne Division Artillery is an inactive field artillery unit of the United States Army, active from 1942–1946 and from 1948–1949. The unit served with the 17th Airborne Division in World War II, and saw action in Belgium and Germany, including participating in Operation Varsity. The unit was reactivated again from 1948–1949, but was not deployed.

History

Lineage and honors

Lineage
Constituted 16 December 1942 in the Army of the United States as Headquarters and Headquarters Battery, 17th Airborne Division Artillery. 
Activated 15 April 1943 at Camp Mackall, North Carolina. 
Inactivated 14 September 1945 at Camp Myles Standish, Massachusetts. 
Allotted 25 June 1948 to the Regular Army. Activated 6 July 1948 at Camp Pickett, Virginia. 
Inactivated 10 June 1949 at Camp Pickett, Virginia.

Unofficial

Campaign participation credit
World War II: Rhineland, Ardennes-Alsace, Central Europe (with arrowhead)

Unofficial

References

External links
 Facebook Page: 17th Airborne Scions Descendants
 Scions of the 17th Airborne - website for veterans of the division and their descendants

017
17
Military units and formations established in 1942
Military units and formations disestablished in 1949